Friendship Baptist Church is a Baptist church located in the Southwest Waterfront neighborhood of Washington, D.C. It was originally known as Virginia Avenue Baptist Church. Organized in 1875, the church is one of Washington, D.C.'s oldest African-American congregations.

Former building
The former church building, located at 734 First Street SW, was built by James A. Boyce in 1886. Friendship Baptist Church moved from that building in 1965 and it was subsequently occupied by Miracle Temple of Faith in about 1974.  Later it was occupied by  Redeemed Temple of Jesus Christ (during 1982–2001). It was listed on the National Register of Historic Places in 2004.

The First Street church building is now occupied by the Blind Whino Arts Club, and was repainted with a full wrap-around mural.

The building has a central gable facade with two corner towers.  It is described as having "a vernacular interpretation of the Romanesque Revival style with some Gothic Revival details (namely lancet arch windows)."

Church leaders
Friendship Baptist Church has been led by the following pastors:

 Reverend Robert S. Laws (1875-1891)
 Reverend W.H. Scott (1891-1892)
 Reverend J.T. Clark (1892)
 Reverend A.W. Shields (1892-1896)
 Reverend Alexander A. Wilbanks(1896-1915)
 Reverend Jerry Fields (1917-1918)
 Reverend D.Y. Campbell (1922-1926)
 Reverend Benjamin H. Whiting (1927-1980)
 Reverend William Henry Montgomery (1981-1993)
 Reverend Dr. G. Martin Young (1996-1998)
 Reverend Milton A. Covington (1999-2002)
 Reverend Dr. Chester A. McDonald, Sr. (2002-2003)
 Reverend J. Michael Little (2003-Present)

See also
 National Register of Historic Places listings in central Washington, D.C.

References

External links
 
Official website

19th-century Baptist churches in the United States
Baptist churches in Washington, D.C.
Baptist organizations established in the 19th century
Churches completed in 1886
Churches on the National Register of Historic Places in Washington, D.C.
Religious organizations established in 1875
Romanesque Revival church buildings in Washington, D.C.
1875 establishments in Washington, D.C.